Vladislav Olegovich Tselovalnikov (born 21 September 1991) is a Russian former football goalkeeper.

Club career
He made his debut in the Russian Second Division for FC Volgar-Astrakhan Astrakhan on 31 July 2012 in a game against FC Dagdizel Kaspiysk.

Personal
His father Oleg Tselovalnikov played in the Soviet Top League for FC Rotor Volgograd.

References

External links
 
 
 Career summary by sportbox.ru

1991 births
Sportspeople from Astrakhan
Living people
Russian footballers
Association football goalkeepers
FC Volgar Astrakhan players
FC SKA Rostov-on-Don players
Speranța Nisporeni players
FC Smena Komsomolsk-na-Amure players
Moldovan Super Liga players
Russian expatriate footballers
Expatriate footballers in Moldova